The 2016 Croatia Open Umag  (also known as the Konzum Croatia Open Umag for sponsorship reasons) was a men's tennis tournament played on outdoor clay courts. It was the 27th edition of the Croatia Open, and part of the ATP World Tour 250 Series of the 2016 ATP World Tour. It took place at the International Tennis Center in Umag, Croatia, from 18 July through 24 July 2016.

Singles main draw entrants

Seeds 

 1 Rankings are as of July 11, 2016

Other entrants 
The following players received wildcards into the singles main draw:
  Nikola Mektić 
  Nino Serdarušić
  Franko Škugor

The following players received entry from the qualifying draw:
  Nikola Čačić 
  André Ghem 
  Michael Linzer 
  Enrique López-Pérez

The following player received entry as a special exempt:
  Renzo Olivo

Retirements 
  Franko Škugor

Doubles main draw entrants

Seeds 

 Rankings are as of July 11, 2016

Other entrants 
The following pairs received wildcards into the doubles main draw:
  Tomislav Draganja /  Nino Serdarušić
  Dino Marcan /  Ante Pavić

The following pair received entry as alternates:
  Riccardo Ghedin /  Alessandro Motti

Champions

Singles 

  Fabio Fognini def.  Andrej Martin, 6–4, 6–1

Doubles 

  Martin Kližan /  David Marrero def.  Nikola Mektić /  Antonio Šančić, 6–4, 6–2

References

External links 
 Official website

Croatia Open Umag
2016
2016 in Croatian tennis